The 1999–00 season of the División de Honor de Futsal is the 11th season of top-tier futsal in Spain.

Regular season

League table

*At end of season, CLM Talavera's seat was sold to Azkar Lugo.

Playoffs

Goalscorers

See also
División de Honor de Futsal
Futsal in Spain

External links
1999–2000 season at lnfs.es

1999 00
Spain
futsal